Real Club Deportivo Mallorca is a professional football club based in Palma on the island of Mallorca, Spain, which plays in the top tier of Spanish football, La Liga.

Héctor Cúper is the most successful manager in terms of achievements. Winning the 1998 Supercopa de España after finishing Runner-up in the 1997–98 Copa del Rey to Barcelona and taking the team to the UEFA Cup Winners' Cup final a year later, which they lost to Lazio. Cúper also achieved a best-ever third place finish in the 1998–99 season, which would ony be repeated by Luis Aragonés during the 2000–01 campaign.

List of managers

References

RCD Mallorca managers
Mallorca